Hugh Patrick O'Hagan (1920 – 10 April 1984) was an Irish boxer. He competed in the men's light heavyweight event at the 1948 Summer Olympics.

References

External links

1920 births
Date of birth missing
1984 deaths
Irish male boxers
Olympic boxers of Ireland
Boxers at the 1948 Summer Olympics
Light-heavyweight boxers